Xu Xiaolong (born 27 April 1989) is a Chinese former footballer who played as defender.

Club career 
Xu Xiaolong started his football career when he was promoted to Chinese Super League side Tianjin Teda's first team squad in the 2011 season. He transferred to China League Two side Hebei Zhongji in 2012. He was the key player of Hebei to win promotion to China League One in 2013 season and promotion to Chinese Super League in 2015 season. He made his Super League debut on 17 September 2016 in a 3–2 away defeat against Yanbian Funde, coming on as a substitute for Ding Haifeng in the 50th minute. In February 2017, Xu was loaned to League One side Shanghai Shenxin for one season.

On 17 January 2018, Xu transferred to China League One side Zhejiang Greentown along with teammate Zhu Haiwei. He would make his debut on 24 March 2018 in a league game against Zhejiang Yiteng F.C. that ended in a 2-1 defeat. After several seasons as a squad player he would aid them to promotion to the top tier at the end of the 2021 campaign.

Career statistics 
.

References

External links
 

Living people
1989 births
Association football defenders
Chinese footballers
Footballers from Tianjin
Tianjin Jinmen Tiger F.C. players
Hebei F.C. players
Shanghai Shenxin F.C. players
Zhejiang Professional F.C. players
Chinese Super League players
China League One players
China League Two players